Tropodiaptomus is a genus of copepods in the family Diaptomidae. It includes the following species, many of which are narrow endemics and are included on the IUCN Red List (VU: vulnerable species; EX: extinct; DD: data deficient):
Tropodiaptomus agegedensis (S. Wright & Tressler, 1928)
Tropodiaptomus asimi Dumont & Maas, 1989
Tropodiaptomus australis Kiefer, 1936
Tropodiaptomus banforanus Kiefer, 1932
Tropodiaptomus bhangazii Rayner, 1994
Tropodiaptomus borutzkyi Stepanova in Borutsky, Stepanova & Kos, 1991
Tropodiaptomus burundensis Dumont & Maas, 1988  
Tropodiaptomus capriviensis Rayner, 1994
Tropodiaptomus chauhani Roy, 1984
Tropodiaptomus ctenopus (Kiefer, 1930)  
Tropodiaptomus cunningtoni (G. O. Sars, 1909)
Tropodiaptomus czekanowskii (Grochmalicki, 1913)
Tropodiaptomus digitatus Dussart, 1981
Tropodiaptomus doriai (Richard, 1894)
Tropodiaptomus episcopus (Brehm, 1930)
Tropodiaptomus euchaetus Kiefer, 1936
Tropodiaptomus falcatus Kiefer, 1933  
Tropodiaptomus femineus (Kiefer, 1930)
Tropodiaptomus foresti Defaye, 2002
Tropodiaptomus gemini Brehm, 1951
Tropodiaptomus gigantoviger Brehm, 1933
Tropodiaptomus hebereri (Kiefer, 1930)
Tropodiaptomus hutchinsoni (Kiefer, 1927)
Tropodiaptomus imitator Brehm, 1955
Tropodiaptomus incognitus Dussart & Gras, 1966
Tropodiaptomus kieferi Marquès, 1966
Tropodiaptomus kilimensis (Daday, 1910)  
Tropodiaptomus kissi Dussart, 1978  
Tropodiaptomus kraepelini (Poppe & Mrázek, 1895)
Tropodiaptomus lakhimpurensis Reddiah, 1964
Tropodiaptomus lanaonus Kiefer, 1982
Tropodiaptomus lateralis Kiefer, 1932
Tropodiaptomus laurentii Gauthier, 1951
Tropodiaptomus loveni (Guerne & Richard, 1890)
Tropodiaptomus madagascariensis (Rylov, 1918)  
Tropodiaptomus magnus Kiefer, 1933
Tropodiaptomus malaicus (Grochmalicki, 1915)
Tropodiaptomus monardi Kiefer, 1937
Tropodiaptomus mutatus Kiefer, 1936
Tropodiaptomus neumanni (Douwe, 1912)  
Tropodiaptomus nielseni Brehm, 1952
Tropodiaptomus njinei Chiambeng & Dumont, 2002
Tropodiaptomus novaeguineae Brehm, 1959
Tropodiaptomus orientalis (Brady, 1886)
Tropodiaptomus oryzanus Kiefer, 1937
Tropodiaptomus palustris (Kiss, 1960)  
Tropodiaptomus processifer (Kiefer, 1926)
Tropodiaptomus ricardoae (Harding, 1942)
Tropodiaptomus ruttneri (Brehm, 1923)
Tropodiaptomus schmeili (Kiefer, 1926)
Tropodiaptomus schubotzi (Douwe, 1914)
Tropodiaptomus signatus Kiefer, 1982
Tropodiaptomus simplex (G. O. Sars, 1909)   (Lake Tanganyika)
Tropodiaptomus spectabilis (Kiefer, 1929)
Tropodiaptomus stuhlmanni (Mrázek, 1895)   (Lake Victoria)
Tropodiaptomus symoensi Einsle, 1971
Tropodiaptomus turkanae Maas, Green & Dumont, 1995
Tropodiaptomus vandouwei (Früchtl, 1924)
Tropodiaptomus vicinus (Kiefer, 1930)
Tropodiaptomus worthingtoni (Lowndes, 1936)  
Tropodiaptomus zambeziensis Rayner, 1994

References

Diaptomidae
Freshwater crustaceans of Africa
Taxonomy articles created by Polbot